The following is a list of Law & Order episodes from the series' twelfth season, which originally aired from September 26, 2001 to May 22, 2002. This season is the last season to feature Dianne Wiest as DA Nora Lewin and the first to feature  Elisabeth Röhm as ADA Serena Southerlyn.

Cast
Season 12 began with an unchanged cast. Serena Southerlyn (played by Elisabeth Röhm) replaced season 11's Abbie Carmichael (Angie Harmon in the role of Assistant District Attorney).

Main Cast
 Jerry Orbach as Senior Detective Lennie Briscoe
 Jesse L. Martin as Junior Detective Ed Green
 S. Epatha Merkerson as Lieutenant Anita Van Buren
 Sam Waterston as Executive Assistant District Attorney Jack McCoy
 Elisabeth Röhm as Assistant District Attorney Serena Southerlyn
 Dianne Wiest as Interim District Attorney Nora Lewin

Recurring cast
 Leslie Hendrix as Dr. Elizabeth Rodgers

Episodes

Notes

The second Law & Order spinoff, Law & Order: Criminal Intent, debuted at the time of this season.
 In the aftermath of the September 11 attacks, the main title voiceover by Steven Zirnkilton was changed for the first few episodes to include the following dedication: "On September 11, 2001, New York City was ruthlessly and criminally attacked. While no tribute can ever heal the pain of that day, the producers of Law & Order dedicate this season to the victims and their families and to the firefighters and police officers who remind us with their lives and courage what it truly means to be an American". This voiceover was also heard at the beginning of Law & Order: Special Victims Unit and Law & Order: Criminal Intent.
 Elisabeth Röhm joins the cast as ADA Serena Southerlyn in this season.
 This is the final season to feature Dianne Wiest as IDA Nora Lewin.
 In the episode "Attorney Client," Annie Parisse plays a stripper named Jasmine Blake before assuming a regular role on the series as ADA Alexandra Borgia, Season 15, Episode 14.
 Barry Schindel, Jeffrey M. Hayes, and Peter Jankowski serve as executive producers this season, René Balcer having left to be the executive producer for the series's second spin-off, Law & Order: Criminal Intent (Balcer left CI after the 5th season and returned to L&O in its 17th season).

References

External links
Episode guide from NBC.com

12
2001 American television seasons
2002 American television seasons